Of the 5 New Jersey incumbents, only one was re-elected.

See also 
 List of United States representatives from New Jersey

1800
New Jersey
United States House of Representatives